In human mitochondrial genetics, Haplogroup D is a human mitochondrial DNA (mtDNA) haplogroup.
It is a descendant haplogroup of haplogroup M, thought to have arisen somewhere in Asia, between roughly 60,000 and 35,000 years ago (in the Late Pleistocene, before the Last Glacial Maximum and the settlement of the Americas).

In contemporary populations, it is found especially in Central and Northeast Asia. 
Haplogroup D (more specifically, subclade D4) is one of five main haplogroups found in the indigenous peoples of the Americas, the others being A, B, C, and X. Among the Nepalese population, haplogroup D is the most dominant maternal lineage in Tamang (26.1%) and Magar (24.3%).

Subclades
There are two principal branches, D4 and D5'6. 
D1,  D2 and D3 are subclades of D4.

D4
D1 is a basal branch of D4 that is widespread and diverse in the Americas. 
Subclades D4b1, D4e1, and D4h are found both in Asia and in the Americas and are thus of special interest for the settlement of the Americas.
D2, which occurs with high frequency in some arctic and subarctic populations (especially Aleuts), is a subclade of D4e1 parallel to D4e1a and D4e1c, so it properly should be termed D4e1b. 
D3, which has been found mainly in some Siberian populations and in Inuit of Canada and Greenland, is a branch of D4b1c.

D4 (3010, 8414, 14668): The subclade D4 is the most frequently occurring mtDNA haplogroup among modern populations of northern East Asia, such as Japanese, Okinawans, Koreans, northern Han Chinese (e.g. from Lanzhou), and some Mongolic- or Tungusic-speaking populations of the Hulunbuir region, such as Barghuts in Hulun Buir Aimak, Mongols and Evenks in New Barag Left Banner, and Oroqens in Oroqen Autonomous Banner. D4 is also the most common haplogroup among the Oroks of Sakhalin, the Buryats and Khamnigans of the Buryat Republic, the Kalmyks of the Kalmyk Republic, the Telenghits and Kazakhs of the Altai Republic, and the Kyrgyz of Kyzylsu Kyrgyz Autonomous Prefecture. It also predominates among published samples of Paleo-Indians and individuals whose remains have been recovered from Chertovy Vorota Cave. Spread also all over China, the Himalayas, Central Asia, Siberia, and indigenous peoples of the Americas, with some cases observed in Southeast Asia, Southwest Asia, and Europe. Khattak and Kheshgi in Peshawar Valley, Pakistan
D4* - China, Korea, Japan, Thailand (Lisu from Mae Hong Son Province), USA, Russia, Georgia, Iraq, Turkey, Greece

D1 – America
D1a – Colombia
D1a1 – Brazil (Surui, Gavião)
D1a2 – Guaraní
D1b – United States (Hispanic), Dominican Republic, Puerto Rico
D1c – United States (Hispanic), Mexican
D1d
D1d1 – United States (Hispanic), Mexican
D1d2 – Mexican
D1e – Brazil (Karitiana, Zoró)
D1f – Colombia (incl. Coreguaje), Ecuador (Amerindian Kichwas from the Amazonian provinces of Pastaza, Orellana, and Napo), Peru, Mexican, USA
D1f1 – Venezuela, Brazil (Karitiana), Tiriyó, Waiwai, Katuena
D1f2 – Colombia
D1f3 – Mexico, USA (Native American)
D1g – Southern Cone of South America
D1g1
D1g1a
D1g1b
D1g2
D1g2a
D1g3
D1g4
D1g5
D1g6
D1h
D1h1 – Mexican
D1h2 – Mexican
D1i – Peru, Mexican, United States (Hispanic)
D1i1 – Mexican
D1i2 – Mexican
D1j – Southern Cone of South America (incl. the Gran Chaco in Argentina)
D1j1
D1j1a
D1j1a1 – Argentina
D1j1a2
D1k – Peru, Mexican, United States (Hispanic)
D1m – Mexican
D1n – United States (Hispanic), Mexico
D1r – Peru
D1u
D1u1 – Peru

D4a – China, Northern Thailand (Khon Mueang from Chiang Mai Province and Lamphun Province, Phuan from Phrae Province), Laos (Lao from Luang Prabang), Japan, Korea, Kazakhstan, Uzbekistan (Tajik from Ferghana), Pakistan (Saraiki), Mongolia
D4a1 – Japan, Korea, Negidal, Ulchi
D4a1a – Japan
D4a1a1 – Japan, Korea
D4a1a1a – Japan
D4a1b – Japan, Korea
D4a1b1 – Japan
D4a1c – Japan, Korea
D4a1d – Japan
D4a1e – China, Taiwan, Dirang Monpa, Yakut
D4a1e1 – Japan, Uyghurs
D4a1f – Japan
D4a1f1 – Japan
D4a1g – China, Bargut
D4a1h – Japan
D4a2 – Japan, Korea
D4a2a – Japan, Korea
D4a2b – Japan
D4a3
D4a3a
D4a3a* – China (Henan), Korea
D4a3a1 – China (Taihang area in Henan province, Hunan Han, Korean from Yanbian Korean Autonomous Prefecture)
D4a3a2 – Japan
D4a3b
D4a3b* – China
D4a3b1 – Japan, Korea, China（Korean from Yanbian Korean Autonomous Prefecture, China）, Pakistan (Kalash)
D4a3b2 – China, Taiwan
D4a4 – Japan
D4a5
D4a6 - China (Eastern China, Korean from Yanbian Korean Autonomous Prefecture), Mauritius
D4a-b
D4a-b* – China (Han Chinese from Taizhou, Zhejiang)
D4a7
D4a7* – China
D4a7a
D4a7a* – Taiwan
D4a7a1 – Taiwan (Hakka Han from Neipu, Pingtung)
D4a7b
D4a7b* – Vietnam (Kinh from Ho Chi Minh City, Vietnam)
D4a7b1 – China (Souther Han Chinese from Hunan), Taiwan (Minnan Han from Kaohsiung and Tsou from Alishan, Chiayi), Vietnam (Kinh from Gia Lâm District, Hanoi)  Singapore (Malaysian)
D4a8 – China
D4b – Thailand (Thai from Central Thailand)
D4b1
D4b1* – Russia (Tuvan from Tuva Republic, Tatarstan), Kyrgyzstan (Kyrgyz), China (Uyghur), Mongols
D4b1a
D4b1a* – China (Bargut from Inner Mongolia), South Korea, Thailand (Iu Mien from Nan Province)
D4b1a1 – South Korea, Japan
D4b1a1a – South Korea, Japan, Kyrgyzstan
D4b1a2 – Yukaghir, Neolithic Agin-Buryat Autonomous Okrug
D4b1a2a
D4b1a2a* – Hungary, Khamnigan, Han (Beijing)
D4b1a2a1 – China (Bargut, Uyghur), Mongol, Kazakhstan, Karakalpak, Azeri, Turkey, Poland, Russia (Buryats in Buryat Republic and Irkutsk Oblast, Tubalars, Ayon, Yanranay, Karaginsky District), Inuit (Canada, Greenland), Canada, Native American (USA)
D4b1a2a2 – Buryat, Todzhins, Tuvan
D4b1b'd
D4b1b - China, Taiwan
D4b1b1 – Japan
D4b1b1a – Japan
D4b1b1a1 – Japan
D4b1b2 – Japan, China (Han from Zhanjiang)
D4b1d – China (Gelao from Daozhen)
D4b1c
D3 – Oroqen, Buryat, Barghut, Yukaghir, Even, Evenk, Yakut, Dolgan, Nganasan, Inuit
D3* – Buryat, Yakut, Yukaghir (Lower Indigirka River, Chukotka, etc.), Nganasan (Vadei from the Taimyr Peninsula), Even (Severo-Evensk district, Sebjan, Sakkyryyr, Berezovka), Evenk (Taimyr Peninsula), Oroqen, Mansi
D3a – Bargut, Buryat, Evenk (Stony Tunguska)
D3b – Oroqen
D3c
D3c* – Buryat
D3c1
D3c1* – Nganasan (Avam from the Taimyr Peninsula)
D3c1a
D3c1a1
D3c1a1a – Agin-Buryat Autonomous Okrug (Neolithic Transbaikal), Bargut (modern Inner Mongolia)
D3c1a1b – Italy (Roman Empire)
D3c1a2 – Ust'-Dolgoe site of Glazkovo culture (Bronze Age Cis-Baikal), Onnyos burial near Amga River (Middle Neolithic central Yakutia)
D3d – Even (Tompo District of Yakutia, Lower Indigirka River)
D3e – Even (Tompo District of Yakutia)
D4b2 – Japan, specimen from 4256–4071 cal YBP (Middle Jōmon period) Yokohama, China, Thailand (Hmong from Chiang Rai Province), India (Gallong)
D4b2a – Japan
D4b2a1 – Japan
D4b2a2 – Japan, Korea
D4b2a2a – Japan, Kyrgyzstan
D4b2a2a1 – Japan
D4b2a2a2 – Japan
D4b2a2b – Japan
D4b2b – China (Uyghurs, Tu, Tibet, etc.), South Korea, Japan, Thailand (Khmu from Nan Province), Saudi Arabia
D4b2b1 – Japan, Korea, Buryat, Uyghur, Persian
D4b2b1a – Japan
D4b2b1b – Japan
D4b2b1c – Japan
D4b2b1d – Japan
D4b2b2 – China (Tujia, Han from Lanzhou, etc.), Taiwan (Hakka)
D4b2b2a – China, Taiwan, Vietnam (Lachi)
D4b2b2a1 – Japan, Russia
D4b2b2b – Russia, China, South Korea
D4b2b2c – China, Buryat
D4b2b3 – Japan
D4b2b4 – Northeast India (Sherdukpen), China, Russia (Tuvan)
D4b2b5 – Barguts, Buryat, Tibet, Taiwan
D4b2b6 – Chinese (Beijing, Lanzhou, Denver), Korea, Armenian
D4b2b7 – China, Taiwan (Hakka)
D4b2b8 – Uyghur
D4b2b9
D4b2b9* – China, Xibo
D4b2b9a
D4b2b9a* – Buryat
D4b2b9a1 – China
D4b2c
D4b2d – Inner Mongolia (Bargut, Buryat)
D4c
D4c1 – Uyghur
D4c1a – Japan, Korea
D4c1a1 – Japan, Tashkurgan (Kyrgyz)
D4c1b – Japan, Inner Mongolia
D4c1b1 – Japan, Tibet
D4c1b2 – Japan
D4c2 – Turkmenistan
D4c2a – Uyghur (Artux), Russian Federation
D4c2a1 – Uyghur, Buryat, Bargut, Khamnigan, Ulchi
D4c2b – Yakut, Buryat, Bargut, Daur, Even, Uyghur, Kyrgyz, Kazakhstan, Turk, Russian, Ukraine
D4c2c – Japan
D4d – Japan, Korea

D4e
D4e1 – Taiwan, Czech Republic (West Bohemia), Austrian, Finland, USA
D4e1a – Thailand (Mon from Nakhon Ratchasima Province), Moken, Urak Lawoi, China (Han from Lanzhou, etc.), Tibet, Uyghur, Korea, Japan
D4e1a1 – Japan, Chinese
D4e1a2 – Thailand, Sonowal Kachari
D4e1a2a – Japan, Korea
D4e1a3 – China (Yao from Bama, etc.), Thailand (Hmong, Iu Mien), Vietnam (Cờ Lao, Phù Lá)
D2 – Uyghur
D2a'b
D2a – Aleut, Tlingit
D2a1 – Saqqaq, ancient Canada
D2a1a – Aleut
D2a1b – Siberian Eskimo
D2a2 – Chukchi, Eskimo
D2b – Yukaghir, Even (Maya River, Okhotsk Region)
D2b1 – China, Tibet, Kazakhstan, Kalmyk, Belarus (Tatar)
D2b1a – Buryat, Yakut, Khamnigan, Evenk
D2b2 – Evenk, Bargut
D2c – Buryat
D4e1c – Mexican
D4e2 – Japan, Korea, USA (African American)
D4e2a – Japan, Korea
D4e2b – Japan
D4e2c – Japan
D4e2d – Japan
D4e3 – Northeast Thailand (Black Tai, Saek), China, Lachungpa
D4e4 – Yakut, Ulchi, Bulgaria, Poland, Russian Federation
D4e4a – Evenk, Even, Uyghur
D4e4a1 – Yukaghir, Evenk, Even
D4e4b – Russian, Volga Tatar
D4e5
D4e5a - Xinjiang (Uyghur, Kyrgyz), Russia (Altai Kizhi, Buryat), Inner Mongolia (Bargut), Iran (Qashqai), Japan (Aichi)
D4e5b - Orok (Sakhalin), Even (Nelkan on the Maya River in the Okhotsk Region), Kyrgyz (Artux), Bashkortostan, Han Chinese (Lanzhou, Denver)
D4f – Shor
D4f1 – Japan, Korea, Bargut

D4g
D4g* – Japan, Korea
D4g1 – Japan, Korea, Uyghur, Uzbekistan
D4g1a – Japan
D4g1b – Japan, Taiwan, Belarus
D4g1c – Japan
D4g2 – China
D4g2a – Japan
D4g2a1 – China, Thailand (Mon from Lopburi Province), Bargut, Buryat, Khamnigan
D4g2a1a – Japan
D4g2a1b – China, Thailand (Black Tai from Kanchanaburi Province, Khon Mueang from Chiang Mai Province)
D4g2a1c – Thailand (Mon from Kanchanaburi Province and Ratchaburi Province), China, Wancho, Jammu and Kashmir
D4g2b – China, Buryat
D4g2b1 – Han Chinese, Ulchi
D4g2b1a – Japan

D4h
D4h* – Thailand (Khmu from Nan Province, Htin from Phayao Province, Khon Mueang from Lampang Province), Philippines
D4h1
D4h1* – China
D4h1a - Korea
D4h1a1 – Korea, Japan
D4h1a2 – Japan
D4h1b – Hunan (Han), Japan
D4h1c – China (incl. Tu), Tibet
D4h1c1 – Japan, Korea
D4h1d – Bargut
D4h2 – Ulchi
D4h3 – Thailand (Tai Yuan from Ratchaburi Province)
D4h3a – South America (Peru, Ecuador, Argentina, Bolivia, Brazil), Mexico, USA, and Colombia.
D4h3a1 – Chile
D4h3a1a – Chile
D4h3a1a1 – Chile
D4h3a1a2 – Chile
D4h3a2 – Chile, Argentina
D4h3a3 – Chile
D4h3a3a – Mexico, USA
D4h3a4 – Peru
D4h3a5 – Chile, Peru, Argentina
D4h3a6 – Peru, Ecuador
D4h3a7 – ancient Canada
D4h3a8 – Mexico
D4h3a9 – Peru
D4h3b – China
D4h4 – Uyghur, Tibet, Japan
D4h4a – Kyrgyz (Tashkurgan), Buryat, Bargut
D4i
D4i* – Japan, Uyghur, Israel (Palestinian)
D4i1 – Japan
D4i2 – Uyghur, Yakut, Dolgan, Kazakh, Volga Tatar, Buryat, Bargut, Evenk (Iengra), Even, Nanai, Yukaghir, Russia, Germany, England
D4i3
D4i3* – Nepal (Kathmandu)
D4i3a – China, Taiwan (Atayal)
D4i4 – Uyghur, Tibet (Sherpa), China (Miao), Vietnam (H'Mông)
D4i5 – Japan

D4j – Tibet, Uyghur, Kyrgyz (Kyrgyzstan, Tashkurgan, Artux), Altai, Teleut, Tuvan, Buryat, Bargut, China, Taiwan, Korea, Japan, Turkey, Italy, Czech Republic, Lithuania, Belarus
D4j1 – Thailand (Palaung from Chiang Mai Province), Uyghur
D4j1a – Bargut, Buryat, Khamnigan
D4j1a1 – Lepcha, Gallong, Lachungpa, Sherpa, Tibet, Lahu, Thailand (Lahu from Mae Hong Son Province, Mon from Ratchaburi Province, Lawa from Mae Hong Son Province, Tai Yuan from Uttaradit Province), Kyrgyz, Uyghur, Buryat, Bargut, Khamnigan
D4j1a1a – Gallong, Tibet
D4j1a1b – Toto
D4j1a2 – Tibet, Ladakh
D4j1b – Tibet, Wancho, Nepal, Thailand (Mon from Ratchaburi Province, Palaung and Khon Mueang from Chiang Mai Province), Kyrgyz (Tashkurgan)
D4j1b2 – Gallong
D4j2 – Lithuania, ancient Scythian (Chylenski), Yakut, Dolgan
D4j2a – Mansi, Ket, Yakut (Vilyuy River basin)
D4j-T16311C! – Italy, Ukraine, Lithuania
D4j3 – Russian Federation, Uyghur, Tibet, Japan, Thailand (Mon from Ratchaburi Province)
D4j3a – China, Inner Mongolia, Ulchi
D4j3a1 – Japan
D4j3b - Thailand (Lisu from Mae Hong Son Province), Tibet (Lhoba), Uyghur
D4j11 – Japan, Inner Mongolia, Buryat, Hungary, Italy
D4j4 – Nganasan, Even (Maya River basin, NE Sakha Republic), Evenk (Nyukzha river basin, Iengra River basin)
D4j4a – Evenk (Okhotsk region, Sakha Republic, Iengra River basin), Even (Okhotsk region), Ulchi, Buryat, Yakut (Vilyuy River basin)
D4j5 – Italy, Austria, Czech Republic, Germany, Iran (Khorasan), Uyghur, Kyrgyz, Inner Mongolia, Buryat, Yakut, Yukaghir, Even (Sakha Republic), Evenk (Sakha Republic)
D4j-T146C!
D4j6 – China, Buryat, Dirang Monpa
D4j13 – Volga Tatar, Kyrgyz (Artux), Uyghur, Sherpa (Shigatse)
D4j7 – Tubalar
D4j7a – Buryat, Bargut
D4j8 – China, Bargut, Buryat, Evenk (Sakha Republic), Yakut, Kazakh, Kyrgyz (Artux), Uyghur, Poland, Montenegro, Bosnia and Herzegovina, Serbia, Croatia, Austria, Scotland, Argentina
D4j9 – Bargut, Buryat, Khamnigan, Tuvan
D4j10 – Tubalar, Buryat, Bargut, Khamnigan, Kazakhstan, Turk
D4j12 – Bargut, Buryat, Uyghur, Tatarstan, Belarus, Poland, Italy
D4j14 – Japan
D4j15 – China, Tibet, Kazakhstan
D4j16 – China
D4k'o'p
D4k – Japan, Korea, China (Qinghai, Kinh, etc.), Uyghur, Kyrgyzstan
D4o – Teleut, Uyghur, Buryat
D4o1
D4o1* – Uyghur, Tubalar (Northeast Altai) 
D4o1a – Japan, Buryat
D4o1b – Kyrgyz (Artux), Chelkan, Teleut, Khamnigan, Buryat (Buryat Republic), Han Chinese (N. China)
D4o2 – Bargut, Yakut, Evenk (Sakha Republic), Even (Kamchatka, Sakha Republic), Koryak, Ulchi, China (Han from Lanzhou)
D4o2* – Bargut (Inner Mongolia)
D4o2a – Manchu
D4o2a* – Uyghur, Yakut, Nganasan, Evenk (New Barag Left Banner), Even (Kamchatka), Koryak
D4o2a1 – Negidal, Hezhen, Uyghur, China
D4o2a2 – Yakut, Uyghur, ancient Yana River basin
D4o2a3 – Bargut (Inner Mongolia), Buryat (Zabaykalsky Krai)
D4p
D4p* – Altaian, Buryat
D4p1 – Japan
D4p2 – Buryat
D4l
D4l1
D4l1a – Japan
D4l1a1 – Japan
D4l1b – Bargut (Inner Mongolia), Uyghur
D4l2 – Evenk (Nyukzha, Iengra, Taimyr), Yakut (Central, Vilyuy), Uyghur, Kazakh
D4l2a – Even (Tompo, Sebjan), Yukaghir
D4l2a1 – Even (Sebjan, Sakkyryyr), Evenk (Taimyr), Yakut, Yukaghir
D4l2a2 – Evenk, Negidal, Yukaghir
D4l2b – China, Tibet (Lhasa)
D4m
D4m* – Tubalar (Northeast Altai)
D4m1 – Japan
D4m2 – Mongolia, South Korea
D4m2a – Nivkh, Ulchi, Yakut, Buryat, Evenk, Even, Yukaghir, South Korea
D4m2a* – Nivkh, Buryat
D4m2a1
D4m2a1* – Evenk (Central Siberia)
D4m2a1a – Evens (two from Sakkyryyr and one from Tompo), Yukaghir
D4m2a2 – Nivkh
D4m2a3 – Yakut
D4m2a4 – Nivkh
D4m2b – Tuvinian, Daur Bargut (Inner Mongolia), Mongolia, Uyghur
D4m3 – Kyrgyz (Kyrgyzstan,Artux), Uyghur
D4n
D4n* – Japan, Korea
D4n1
D4n1* – Japan
D4n1a – Japan
D4n2
D4n2a – China
D4n2b – Kyrgyz (Tashkurgan), Tibet, Bargut (Inner Mongolia), Buryat (Irkutsk Oblast)
D4q – Taiwan, China, Kyrgyz, Tajiks, India (Jammu and Kashmir), Germany, Poland, Netherlands, United States
D4q1 – Toto
D4q1a – Toto
D4q2 - Kyrgyz, India (Uttar Pradesh Upper Caste Brahmin)
D4q2a - Sherdukpen
D4q3 - Uyghur
D4q4 - Lhoba
D4r – Thailand, Myanmar
D4s
D4s1
D4s1* – Vietnam (Si La, Hà Nhì)
D4s1a – Vietnam (Hà Nhì)
D4s2 – Tashkurgan (Sarikoli, Kyrgyz)
D4s3 – Tibet (Lhasa), Uyghur, Tuvinian
D4t – China, Korea, Japan
D4u
D4u*
D4u1
D4u1* – Iran (Qashqai)
D4u1a – Tashkurgan (Sarikoli)
D4v – Thailand
D4w – Japan (Tokyo), Tu
D4x – Peru (pre-Columbian Lima)
D4y – Vietnam (La Chí)
D4z – China

D5'6
D5'6 (16189) is mainly found in East Asia and Southeast Asia, especially in China, Korea, and Japan. 
It does not appear to have participated in the migration to the Americas, and frequencies in Central, North, and South Asia are generally lower, although the D5a2a2 subclade is prevalent (57/423 = 13.48%) among the Yakuts, a Turkic-speaking group that migrated to Siberia in historical times under the pressure of the Mongol expansion.
D5 - Taiwan (Paiwan) 
D5a'b (D5-A9180G) - Korean, Tai Yuan in Northern Thailand
D5a - China, Korea, Japan, Buryat, Poland
D5a1 - Japan (TMRCA 7,300 [95% CI 3,300 <-> 14,200] ybp)
D5a1a - Japan
D5a1a1 - Japan
D5a1a2 - Japan
D5a2 - Gallong, Korea (TMRCA 12,500 [95% CI 8,900 <-> 17,100] ybp)
D5a2a - Russia (Tula Oblast, Buryat), China, Japan (TMRCA 10,400 [95% CI 7,400 <-> 14,200] ybp)
D5a2a-T16092C - China, Korea
D5a2a1 - China (Han from Lanzhou, etc.), Tibet (Monpa, Deng), Vietnam (Hà Nhì), Korea, Japan (Gifu), Buryat, Tuvan, Kazakh
D5-C16172T! - Burusho, Tubalar, Kumandin (Turochak), Todzhi (Adir-Kezhig), Buryat (South Siberia, Inner Mongolia), Wancho, Gallong, Monpa, Myanmar (Burmese from Pakokku), Thailand (Lawa from Mae Hong Son Province), China (Han from Fujian, Miao, etc.), Taiwan
D5a2a1a - Japan (Aichi, Chiba, etc.), China
D5a2a1a1 - Japan (Aichi, etc.)
D5a2a1a1a - Japan (Chiba, etc.)
D5a2a1a1b - China (Uyghurs), Poland
D5a2a1a2 - Japan (Gifu, Tokyo, etc.)
D5a2a1b - Sonowal Kachari, Gallong, China (Han from Zhanjiang, etc.), Tibet (Lhoba, Tingri, Deng), Kyrgyz (Artux)
D5a2a1b1 - China, Taiwan (Minnan)
D5a2a2 - Japan (Aichi), Bargut, Buryat, Kyrgyz (Artux), Tibet (Shannan), Yakut, Dolgan, Yukaghir, Evenk (Iengra, Nyukzha, Taimyr, Sakha Republic), Even (Sakha Republic) (TMRCA 3,500 [95% CI 2,300 <-> 5,000] ybp)
D5a2b - Thailand (Iu Mien from Nan Province), Vietnam (Si La, Hà Nhì), Tibet (Deng, Sherpa), China (TMRCA 10,400 [95% CI 7,200 <-> 14,500] ybp)
D5a3 - Tibet, Korea, Japan (TMRCA 11,100 [95% CI 6,300 <-> 18,100] ybp)
D5a3a - China, Tibet, Finland
D5a3a1 - China, Uyghur, Ukraine
D5a3a1a - Finland, Norway (Saami), Russia (Veliky Novgorod, etc.), Mansi
D5a3b - China, Korea (Seoul)
D5b - Uyghur, China
D5b1
D5b1* - China, Uyghur
D5b1a
D5b1a1 - Japan, Korea, China (Hubei, etc.)
D5b1a2 - Japan
D5b1b
D5b1b* - Japan, Korea
D5b1b1 - Japan, Korea, Uzbekistan
D5b1b2
D5b1b2* - Japan, Korea, Taiwan (Minnan), Uyghur
D5b1b2a - Uyghur
D5b1b2b - Uyghur
D5b1b2c - Kyrgyz (Kyrgyzstan)
D5b1b3 - Japan
D5b1b4 - China
D5b1c
D5b1c* - China (Han from Kunming)
D5b1c1 - China, Taiwan, Philippines, Indonesia, Vietnam (Kinh)
D5b1c1* - Taiwan (Minnan, etc.)
D5b1c1a
D5b1c1a* - Taiwan (Amis, Puyuma, etc.), Indonesia (Manado), Chinese (Singapore)
D5b1c1a1 - Philippines (Kankanaey, Ifugao, etc.)
D5b1c1a2 - Philippines (Ibaloi)
D5b1c1b - China
D5b1c2 - Uyghur
D5b1d - Han Chinese (Beijing), Yakut
D5b1e - China
D5b1f - China
D5b2 - Japan
D5b3
D5b3* - Vietnam (Kinh, Tay), Thailand (Phuan), Laos (Lao), Taiwan (Minnan, etc.)
D5b3a - Taiwan (Paiwan, Rukai, Puyuma)
D5b3a1 - Taiwan (Rukai, Bunun, Paiwan, etc.)
D5b3b - Thailand (Shan from Mae Hong Son Province, Black Tai from Kanchanaburi Province, Tai Yuan from Ratchaburi Province), Vietnam (Kinh)
D5b4 - Thailand (Siamese, Hmong from Chiang Rai Province), Vietnam (Tay Nung, Cờ Lao, Tay, Kinh), Taiwan (Minnan, Makatao, etc.), China (Han)
D5b5 - Uyghur
D5c
D5c1 - Japan, Han Chinese (Beijing)
D5c1a - Japan, Taiwan (Minnan, etc.), China, Uyghur, Tubalar, Kumandin (Turochak, Soltonsky District), Shor (Biyka, etc.), Kyrgyzstan (TMRCA 4,500 [95% CI 3,300 <-> 6,100] ybp)
D5c-T16311C! - Vietnam (Kinh), Mongolian, China
D5c2 - China, Japan
D6
D6a - Philippines, East Timor
D6a1
D6a1* - Tibet, China, Korea, Japan
D6a1a - China, Japan
D6a2 - Taiwan (Atayal), Philippines
D6c - China (She people, Han from Zhanjiang), Taiwan (Minnan), Thailand (Phutai from Kalasin Province)
D6c1 - Philippines
D6c1a - Philippines (Maranao)

Table of frequencies by ethnic group

See also

Genealogical DNA test
Genetic genealogy
Human mitochondrial genetics
Population genetics
Human mitochondrial DNA haplogroups
Genetic history of indigenous peoples of the Americas

References

External links
General
Ian Logan's Mitochondrial DNA Site
Haplogroup D
Mannis van Oven's PhyloTree.org - mtDNA subtree D
Spread of Haplogroup D, from National Geographic

D